Bogard Township may refer to:

 Bogard Township, Daviess County, Indiana
 Bogard Township, Henry County, Missouri